Prudence "Prue" Murdoch MacLeod (formerly Odey; born 1958) is an Australian-British non-executive director in the media industry. Murdoch is the eldest child and daughter of Australian-born American billionaire media proprietor Rupert Murdoch. She has held several directorial roles in her father's News Corporation, and is currently a board member of Times Newspapers Ltd, a subsidiary of News Corporation.

Early life and education
Prudence Murdoch was born in August 1958 in Adelaide, South Australia. She is the eldest child and first daughter of Australian-born American media mogul Rupert Murdoch, and his first wife, Australian model Patricia Booker.

She was raised in Adelaide until 1968, one year after her parents' divorce, when she moved to London with her father and stepmother Anna Torv after his purchase of the tabloid newspaper publishing company, News of the World. She received her secondary education at a state school in London, and at the Dalton School in Manhattan after her family relocated to New York City. Murdoch subsequently returned to London where she worked briefly as a tabloid researcher and journalist for News of the World.

Personal life
Murdoch is described, in relation to her inheritance, as "the only one of [Rupert Murdoch's] children not directly competing for his business affections". After her parents' divorce, Murdoch's mother married a Swiss national and began to lead a life of partying, often neglecting Murdoch. In addition to a poor relationship with her own mother, Murdoch also had a poor relationship with her ex-stepmother, Anna Torv.

Marriages and children
In 1985, Murdoch married Crispin Odey, an English financier who would go on to become the highest-earning hedge fund manager in London. The pair were married only briefly, separating and divorcing within 15 months of their marriage. They had no children.

In 1989, Murdoch married Alasdair MacLeod, an Eton-educated businessman who began working for his father-in-law, despite his wife's disapproval of him working in the family business. They have three children: James (b. London, 1991), Angus (b. London, 1993) and Clementine (b. London, 1996), who all were educated and now reside in Sydney.

Net worth

See also 
 The Rise of the Murdoch Dynasty

References

External links 
 

1958 births
Living people
Prudence
Australian billionaires
Female billionaires
Businesspeople from Adelaide